The Staffordshire Ambulance Service NHS Trust was the authority responsible for providing National Health service (NHS) ambulance services in Staffordshire and Stoke-on-Trent in the West Midlands region of England. Staffordshire Ambulance Service was acquired by West Midlands Ambulance Service on 1 October 2007.

See also
 Emergency medical services in the United Kingdom
 List of NHS trusts

References

External links
 Staffordshire Ambulance Service NHS Trust
 Performance rating information from the Healthcare Commission

Health in Staffordshire
Defunct NHS trusts
Defunct ambulance services in England